Jules Dumont was born in Roubaix, 1 January 1888, and died at Suresnes, Mont Valérien, 15 June 1943.

Dumont was a French militant Communist. He fought in the Spanish Civil War, commanding the Commune de Paris Battalion, XI International Brigade. He was active in the French Resistance in the Second World War. Arrested by the Gestapo, he was shot at Suresnes (Fort du Mont-Valérien), near Paris, on 15 June 1943.

Notes

1888 births
Resistance members killed by Nazi Germany
1943 deaths
People from Roubaix
French people of the Spanish Civil War
Communist members of the French Resistance
People executed by Germany by firearm
Deaths by firearm in France
French people executed by Nazi Germany
Executed people from Nord-Pas-de-Calais
Members of the Francs-tireurs et partisans
International Brigades personnel